Cyperus blysmoides is a species of sedge that is native to parts of Africa and the Middle East.

See also 
 List of Cyperus species

References 

blysmoides
Plants described in 1902
Flora of Ethiopia
Flora of Saudi Arabia
Flora of Eritrea
Flora of Yemen
Flora of Kenya
Flora of Tanzania
Taxa named by Christian Ferdinand Friedrich Hochstetter